Xiao Yanyan (953–1009), also known as Empress Dowager Chengtian (承天皇太后) was a Khitan empress and military leader of imperial China's Liao dynasty. She was regent on behalf of her son from 982.

History

Xiao Yanyan was the 3rd child of Xiao Siwen (蕭思溫), Liao's chancellor. Also referred to by the name Xiao Chuo, Xiao's original Khitan family name was Bali (拔裏氏).  She was the youngest of the Xiao sisters, along with Xiao Hunian and Lady Xiao.

Xiao later married Emperor Jingzong of Liao and would go on to bear the crown Prince Yelü Longxu. Being granted the title of Empress, Xiao was influential during her husband's reign. 

She would go on to become regent for her son in 982 when he ascended the Liao throne as Emperor Shengzong at 12 years old after the untimely death of Emperor Jingzong of Liao who died while returning from a hunting trip. In 986, the Liao Empire was invaded by the Song Dynasty to the south under the leadership of Emperor Taizong of Song, but was defeated by Liao forces under Xiao's command which had retreating Song troops thrown into the Xia river. A further invasion by the Song would ensue in 989 only to be defeated once again by Liao forces resulting in the death of Yang Ye. 

As Empress Dowager Chengtian, Xiao commanded her own army of 10,000 cavalry and would personally lead the Liao army in battle against the Song in 1005, despite being well over 50 by that point. Known for her great skills in civil administration, Empress Dowager Chengtian would retained great influence until her death.

She was also instrumental in arranging a marriage between her son and her court lady, Xiao Noujin. However, she had a poor relationship with her two older sisters, and she eventually poisoned or murdered both of them.

Modern references

Film and television
 Portrayed by Mu Qing in the 1995 Chinese movie Great Liao's Empress Dowager.
 Portrayed by Shim Hye-jin in the 2009 Korean TV series Empress Cheonchu.
 Portrayed by Mei Lier in the 2019 Chinese movie Battle Between Song and Liao Dynasties (大破天门阵).
 Portrayed by Tiffany Tang in the 2020 Chinese TV series The Legend of Xiao Chuo.

Literature
 She is also portrayed as an antagonist in many Generals of the Yang Family adaptations.

Notes

References

Citations

Sources 

 
 
 " Women in power 750-1000" from Guide2womenleaders.com, last accessed January 13, 2007

953 births
1009 deaths
Women in medieval warfare
Women in war in China
Women leaders of China
10th-century women rulers
Liao dynasty empresses
Xiao clan
10th-century Khitan women
11th-century Khitan women